Hokejsko drsalni klub Maribor or simply HDK Maribor, also named Lisjaki, is an ice hockey club from Maribor, Slovenia. Established in 1993, they play their home matches at the Tabor Ice Hall.

Honours
Slohokej League
Winners: 2009–10

Players

NHL alumni
Since its foundation, the club has graduated one player who has played in the NHL.

Jan Muršak

References

External links
Official website 
Hokej.si profile 
Eurohockey profile

Ice hockey clubs established in 1993
Ice hockey teams in Slovenia
Sport in Maribor
1993 establishments in Slovenia
Slovenian Ice Hockey League teams
Slohokej League teams
Inter-National League teams